Pat Murray may refer to:
Pat Murray (American football) (born 1984), American football guard
Patty Murray (born 1950), United States Senator from Washington
Pat Murray (ice hockey) (born 1969), retired professional ice hockey player
Pat Murray (baseball) (1897–1983), Major League Baseball pitcher
Pat Murray (footballer) (1868–1925), Scottish footballer (Hibernian and Scotland)
Pat Murray (rugby union) (born 1963), Irish rugby player

See also
Patrick Murray (disambiguation)